Manikrao Palodakar is an Indian politician, elected to the Lok Sabha, the lower house of the Parliament of India as a member of the Indian National Congress.

References

External links
Official biographical sketch in Parliament of India website

India MPs 1971–1977
Lok Sabha members from Maharashtra
Indian National Congress politicians from Maharashtra
People from Jalna district
People from Aurangabad district, Maharashtra